is a Japanese comedy duo consisting of Yūji Tanaka and Hikari Ōta under the entertainment agency, Titan Inc. The comedians first met when they were students in the Department of Fine Arts at Nihon University, and they formed Bakushō Mondai in 1988 after dropping out of school. The name of the duo means literally "burst into/roaring laughter", "problem/question".
The tsukkomi of the two, Tanaka, had a testicle removed because of testicular cancer, and this frequently elicits jokes by the group's boke, Ōta, as well as other personalities that they may be performing with. Ōta is generally the higher profile of the two, and frequently dominates shows that they host with his long-winded speeches.

From August 1995 through November 1997, Bakushō Mondai was involved with the broadcasting of a number of SoundLink Magazines and Games to owners of the Nintendo Satellaview system:
 - SoundLink Magazine (3 days per week between August 1995 - March 1996)
 - SoundLink Magazine (April 1996 - March 1997)
 - SoundLink Game (June 1997 - November 1997)

The duo currently host many variety and quiz shows, as well as commenting on the occasional radio broadcast.

Awards
In 2006, Bakushō Mondai won an "Art Encouragement" award from the Minister of Education, Culture, Sports, Science and Technology recognizing them as facets of modern Japanese culture. They have also won various other awards in the past, including the Golden Arrow award for entertainment in 1997.

References

External links
Bakushō Mondai's profile 
Press release about award

Japanese comedy duos
Nihon University alumni